Black Motion is a South African house duo from Soshanguve, Gauteng, founded in 2010. The group is composed of Bongani Robert Mahosana (former), Roy Thabo Mabogwane and Kabelo Koma.

History 
Black Motion  was formed in 2010, by DJ Murda (born Robert Mahosana),  and Thabo (born Roy Thabo Mabogwane) they are from Soshanguve. That same year, they joined Faimos Entertainment  and released their first single "Banane Mavoko" featuring Jah Rich, which gained them international recognition.

Their debut album Talking to the Drums was released in 2011.

Their third studio album Fortune Teller was released in 2014. The album was certified gold in South Africa. At the 21st ceremony of South African Music Awards Fortune Teller won Best Dance Album. In 2016, they signed a record deal with Sony and began working on their fourth studio album. Ya Badimo was released on October 28, 2016, worldwide. The album won Best Dance Album at 23rd ceremony of South African Music Awards and was certified platinum by the Recording Industry of South Africa (RiSA). In early February 2017, they partnered with Ballantine Scotch Whisky on music campaign titled The Ballantine’s Beat of Africa.

On September 21, 2018, they released a single "Joy Joy" featuring Brenden Praise. The song was certified platinum in South Africa. 

Their fifth studio album Moya Wa Taola was released on October 5, 2018. It was nominated for Album of the Year and won Duo/Group of the Year, Best Dance Album at the 25th South African Music Awards.

Towards the end of 2019, they announced "Everything" featuring South African singer Afrotraction and trumpeter Mo-T. The song was released on November 15, 2020.

In early February 2020, they made collaboration on "Uwrongo" with Prince Kaybee, Shimza and Ami Faku. The song debuted no #1 on Radiomonitor Charts and was certified gold in South Africa. In May 2020, they announced "Don't Let Me Go" featuring Djeff, Malehloka and Miss P via instagram. The song was released on May 15, 2020.

The Healers: The Last Chapter was released on  September 24, 2020.  It features  Nokwazi, Ami Faku, Simmy, Sauti Sol, Sun-El Musician, TRESOR, and Kabza De Small. The album won Best Dance Album at 27th South African Music Awards.  To further promote the album   Red Bull Rendezvous launched a concert which was held Graskop, Mpumalanga.

DJ Murda departed from the group to launch his solo career, and was replaced by Problem Child Ten83 (born Kabelo Koma).  

After a year hiatus the duo announced an upcoming single "Ngoma" with Dr Moruti, Osaze featuring Mazet SA. The song was released on November 25, 2022.

Influence 
The band has cited Miriam Makeba, Fela Kuti, Ladysmith Black Mambazo, Salif Keita and Hugh Masekela as their influence.

Band members

Present members 
 Thabo Roy Mabogwane
 Kabelo Koma

Past Members 
 Bongane Robert Mahosana

Discography  
 Talking To The Drums (2011)
 Aquarian Drums (2012)
 Fortune Teller (2014)
 Ya Badimo (2016)
 Moya Wa Taola (2018)
 The Healers: The Last Chapter (2020)

Awards

Dance Music Awards 

!
|-
|rowspan="2"|2017
|rowspan="2"|Black Motion 
|Best Live Act 
|
|rowspan="2"|
|-
|Best International Producer 
|

DStv Mzansi Viewers Choice Awards 

!  
|-
| rowspan="2"|2017
| "Imali" 
| Favourite Song of the Year 
|  
| rowspan="2"|
|-
| Black Motion 
| Favourite Music Artist/Group 
|

South African Music Awards 

!
|-
|2015
|Fortune Teller
|Best Dance Album 
|
|
|-
|2017
|Ya Badimo
|Best Dance Album 
|
|
|
|-
|rowspan="3"|2019
|rowspan="3"|Moya Wa Taola 
| Album of the Year 
| 
|rowspan="3"|
|-
| Best Dance Album 
| 
|-
| Duo/Group of the Year
| 
|-
|2021
|The Healers: The Last Chapter 
|Best Dance Album 
|
|
|}

References 

House music duos
Musical groups established in 2010
2010 establishments in South Africa